The Apapa Amusement Park is an amusement park in Lagos, Nigeria.
The park was built in 2008 and it spans an area of approximately 7.7 acres. The park reopened after a three-year closure due to environmental and security reasons, and after a complete makeover in 2015.  It is a partnership arrangement between the Lagos State government and a private company, Crystal Cubes Construction Company, which is managed by Mr. Rabih Jaafar.

The Apapa Amusement Pack commenced operation in 1976 under the Lagos Lunar Park, which was jointly owned by the Lagos Island Council, the Lagos Mainland Council, and Improjex, a company based in Switzerland that was responsible for managing and maintaining the park. Here are compiled list of games offered at the Amusement Park.

References

External links

Amusement parks in Lagos